Trevor Matthewson (born 12 February 1963) is an English former professional footballer who played as a centre half. He played more than 500 senior games, including over 200 for Birmingham City.

Biography
Trevor Matthewson was born in Sheffield into a footballing family: both his grandfather (Tommy Matthewson for Sheffield Wednesday and South Shields) and uncle (Reg Matthewson) had played professionally. He began his football career as an apprentice with home-town club Sheffield Wednesday, but failed to make the grade. After two seasons as a professional he dropped down a division to join Newport County and two years later he dropped another division to Stockport County. After a further two years he left the Football League entirely and signed for Lincoln City in the Conference. As captain he led them to the Conference championship and promotion to the Football League in 1988.

A year later he moved to Birmingham City for a fee determined by tribunal of £45,000. In his first season, 1989–90, he became the first Birmingham player to appear in every match of a 46-game League season, a feat he repeated the following year. He made more than 200 appearances for Birmingham, played in the final of the Associate Members' Cup in 1991, and helped them gain promotion to the newly designated First Division the following season.

After leaving Birmingham he had spells at Preston North End, Bury, Hereford United, Ilkeston Town and Gresley Rovers. After retiring from football, Matthewson returned to his home town of Sheffield, running first a shop and then a market stall trading in fish and meat.

Honours
Lincoln City
 Football Conference champions and promotion to the Football League: 1987–88
Birmingham City
 Associate Members' Cup winners: 1990–91
 Football League Third Division promotion: 1991–92

References
General

Trevor Matthewson at Post War English & Scottish Football League A–Z Player's Database

Specific

External links

1963 births
Living people
Footballers from Sheffield
English footballers
Association football central defenders
Sheffield Wednesday F.C. players
Newport County A.F.C. players
Stockport County F.C. players
Lincoln City F.C. players
Birmingham City F.C. players
Preston North End F.C. players
Bury F.C. players
Witton Albion F.C. players
Hereford United F.C. players
Ilkeston Town F.C. (1945) players
Gresley F.C. players
English Football League players
National League (English football) players
Southern Football League players